Bette of Roses is the eighth studio album by the American singer Bette Midler. It was released by Atlantic Records on July 18, 1995, in the United States. The title was a play on the title of one of the tracks, "Bed of Roses". It became Midler's final album for the label, twenty-three years after the release of her debut album The Divine Miss M, since she was transferred to Atlantic's sister label Warner Bros. Records for her next two albums, then left the Warner group completely in 2002 when she signed with the Sony-owned Columbia Records.

Composition
Bette of Roses marked a change in musical direction as it exclusively included contemporary material composed by songwriters in the soft rock, country and folk genres such as Cheryl Wheeler, Maria McKee, Bonnie Hayes, Marc Jordan, Tonio K, Andy Hill, Pete Sinfield and Roger Cook. "In This Life" had previously been recorded by country singer Collin Raye on his 1992 album of the same name. According to AllMusic's review, Midler is said to have personally chosen the track listing from "hundreds and hundreds of songs." Just like Some People's Lives the album was chiefly produced by Arif Mardin, but the arrangements were consequently also more guitar-based and the soundscape altogether more acoustic than synthesized, the songs chosen were mainly midtempo ballads, like "Bottomless," "As Dreams Go By" and "I Believe In You," or country rock influenced tracks, like "I Know This Town" and "The Last Time," and the set as a whole was geared towards the American adult contemporary and adult Top 40 markets rather than the pop or dance charts.

Promotion
A remixed dance version of Maria McKee's country rock ballad "To Deserve You," which more or less only retained the lead vocals and a sample of the spoken line "I would die for you" from the album version, which had been arranged by the composer herself. The original backing track was replaced with a 123 BPM mid-'90s dance production in the style of house music remixers like Shep Pettibone, Frankie Knuckles and Junior Vasquez, although it in fact had been remixed and re-produced by Arif Mardin himself. The promo video was also re-edited and re-released, then using the dance remix instead of the original Bette of Roses recording. In Europe, Australia and New Zealand the remix single was issued to promote Atlantic/Warner Music's expanded re-release of Midler's 1993 hits compilation Experience the Divine: Greatest Hits—on which it was placed as the opening track—instead of the actual Bette of Roses album. Although notably different to Midler's original recording of the song and indeed the whole Bette of Roses album project as such, the dance remix of "To Deserve You" proved to be one of the biggest commercial successes of her musical career as the track became a major dancefloor hit in the US in early 1996, reaching No. 1 on the Hot Dance Club Play chart.

Critical reception

AllMusic editor Peter Fawthrop rated the album four out of five stars and called Bette of Roses a "very focused album." He further wrote: "Midler brings a very poignant and inspiring set this time round; with less emphasis on laughs, it almost works as an extension of 1990's Some People's Lives [...] There is a certain degree of sentimentality on Bette of Roses, but it never turns drippy [...] Bette of Roses, like so many of the Divine Miss M's offerings, is cause for celebration." Los Angeles Times critic Jean Rosenbluth found that "pretty much the only thing about Bette of Roses that will raise a smile is its cute title. Which is not to say the album is wholly without appeal. It's just that the entertainment it provides is so, well, mainstream. The shallowness of the material  practically every selection is the aural equivalent of a romance novel – is almost unbearable. And the presentation isn't much better." In a retrospective review of the album, Peter Piatkowski from PopMatters called the album "a warm embrace."

Chart performance
Upon its release, Bette of Roses proved to be Midler's lowest-charting studio album since 1983's No Frills, peaking at number 45 on US Billboard 200 and number 55 on the UK Albums Chart. A steady seller, it was eventually certified Platinum by the Recording Industry Association of America (RIAA) in 2001, six years after its original release. In the United Kingdom, it was certified Silver by the British Phonographic Industry (BPI) in 2013.

Track listing
All tracks produced by Arif Mardin.

Personnel
Musicians

 Bette Midler – lead vocals, harmony vocals
 Lani Groves – background vocals
 Ula Hedwig – background vocals
 Vaneese Thomas – background vocals
 Angela Cappelli – background vocals 
 Rachele Cappelli – background vocals
 Mike Baird – drums
 Joe Mardin - drums, background vocals
 Paulinho da Costa – percussion 
 Michael O'Reilly – guitar
 Dean Parks – guitar
 Danny Jacob – guitar
 Michael Landau – guitar 
 Jay Dee Maness – steel guitar 
 Buzz Feiten – guitar, rhythm guitar, tambourine   
 Jerry Barnes – bass guitar, background vocals
 Michael Visceglia – bass 
 Tom "T-Bone" Wolk – bass
 Reggie Hamilton – bass
 Abraham Laboriel – bass
 Bobby Lyle – piano
 Robbie Buchanan – piano, keyboards, synthesizer, programming
 Robbie Kondor – organ, electric piano, keyboards, synthesizer, programming
 Steve Skinner – keyboards, synthesizer, programming
 Larry Cohn – synthesizer 
 Marc Mann – programming
 Jimmy Bralower – drum programming
 Bonnie Hayes – programming    
 Chris Botti – trumpet
 Shelley Woodworth – oboe
 Gene Orloff – violin, concert master

Production

 Arif Mardin – record producer, musical arranger
 Marc Mann – producer
 Robbie Buchanan – producer, arranger
 Robbie Kondor – producer, arranger
 Steve Skinner – producer, arranger
 Bonnie Hayes – producer, arranger 
 Buzz Feiten – associate producer, arranger
 Maria McKee – arranger
 Bruce Brody – arranger
 Andy Grassi – engineer 
 Michael O'Reilly – engineer
 Jack Joseph Puig – engineer
 George Marino – mastering
 Recorded at The New Hit Factory and Right Track Recording, New York; Andora Studios, Conway Studios and Record One, California.

Charts

Certifications

References

Bette Midler albums
1995 albums
Albums produced by Arif Mardin
Atlantic Records albums